The Fowler Elementary School District is an elementary school district in southwest Phoenix, Arizona. It operates six schools: two middle schools and four elementary schools. The superintendent is Marvene Lobato.

References

External links
 

School districts in Maricopa County, Arizona
School districts in Phoenix, Arizona